Brandon Potter (born 6 August 1984) is an American politician who is state representative in the Rhode Island House of Representatives for the 16th district. In the 2020 election, Potter primaried incumbent representative Christopher Millea, a close ally of speaker Nicholas Mattiello, with the support of the Working Families Party, winning the Democratic nomination. After being unable to contact Millea, Potter was motivated to run for office when his girlfriend was removed from a kidney transplant waiting list, and the Herb Chambers car dealership he was working at was shut down due to the COVID-19 pandemic. Potter proceeded to defeat Republican Maryann Lancia in the general election by a margin of 585 votes. He was endorsed by Bernie Sanders.

Following the news that state Rep. Justin Price had attended the 2021 United States Capitol attack, Potter was the first elected official to publicly call for him to resign.

A former member of the Rhode Island Political Cooperative, he was expelled from the group for supporting House Speaker Joe Shekarchi. Potter later called the organization “toxic to the progressive movement” after the group faced criticism for targeting other progressives.

References

Democratic Party members of the Rhode Island House of Representatives
1984 births
Living people